Revelations of an Insomniac  or  Openbaringen van een Slapeloze  is a 1991 Dutch drama film directed by Pim de la Parra.

Cast
Miguel Stigter	... 	Prof. Mr. Dr. Drs. J.A. Wierook
Marian Mudder	... 	Anna Wierook (as Marian Morée)
Liz Snoyink	... 	Lydia
Bart Oomen	... 	1st Research assistant
Bodil de la Parra	... 	2nd Research assistant
Joanna Swaan	... 	3rd Research assistant
Johan Leysen	... 	Visitor
Camilla Braaksma	... 	Visitor
Jacob Smolders	... 	Truck driver

External links 
 

Dutch drama films
1991 films
1990s Dutch-language films
1991 drama films